In telecommunication, the term cancel character has the following meanings: 

A control character ("CAN", "Cancel", U+0018, or ^X) used to indicate that the data with which it is associated are in error or are to be disregarded. Exact meaning can depend on protocol. For example:
 In some journalistic text transmission formats, it signifies that the preceding word should be deleted; it is sometimes called "Kill Word" ("KW") in this context.
 In some Videotex formats, it stops any running macros. In others, it clears the current line after the cursor position (compare ).
A control character ("CCH", "Cancel Character", U+0094, or ESC T) used to erase the previous character. This character was created as an unambiguous alternative to the much more common backspace character ("BS", U+0008), which has a now mostly obsolete alternative function of causing the following character to be superimposed on the preceding one.

References

Control characters